is a 1984 Japanese animated film. It is the second theatrical film based on the anime series Kinnikuman. It was released in Japan on December 22, 1984 alongside Dr. Slump and Arale-chan: Hoyoyo! The Treasure of Nanaba Castle and Uchuu Keiji Shaider: Follow the Shigishigi Kidnapping Gang!. It is set after the Seven Akuma Choujin Arc.

It was the first movie to feature the character Buffaloman and was the first of only two films to feature the Announcer (the other being Crisis in New York!). It is the first anime appearance of Bibinba, who appears as Kinnikuman's fiancee in the original manga.

New characters

Plot
The mighty Horumon clan have been rivals of the Kinniku Clan for years, but today they are nearly extinct. When the last daughter of the Horumon Clan falls in love with Kinnikuman during her mission to assassinate him, her father Horumon Yaki enlists the aide of Shishkeba Boo of the Barbecue Clan, promising him Bibinba's hand in marriage. Shishkeba Boo himself has joined forces with the "Dark Monarch" Black Emperor, who looks to destroy Kinnikuman. Two of his spies (series creators Yudetamago in a cameo) have learned of Kinnikuman's location, so they head for Earth.

While Kinnikuman whines about not being interviewed on the Choujin Hour with the rest of the Idol Choujins, Chairman Harabote arrives with a letter of challenge from Shishkeba Boo. Kinnikuman heads to Mount Fuji and the fight begins. Meanwhile, Black Emperor sends out his  to attack the Idol Choujins.

As Kinnikuman's fight continues, Great Ukon arrives with his minions to help Shishkeba Boo. However, Shishkeba Boo is outraged by this cowardly tactic and fights off the minions while Kinnikuman defeats Great Ukon with a Kinniku Buster. Black Emperor then arrives and challenges Kinnikuman. When Kinnikuman refuses, he places Bibinba and her father on a large boulder and surrounds them with a lake of fire. Kinnikuman tries to walk through the flames, but only gets halfway through before almost passing out. Suddenly, Terryman and Warsman arrive and pull him out while Robin Mask and Rikishiman save Bibinba and her father. With the Idol Choujins all there, the real fights begin.

Kinnikuman is supposed to fight the Black Satan corps but is easily dominated by them. Black Emperor believes he has won and begins to leave. Suddenly, Buffaloman arrives and volunteers to take on the Black Satans while Kinnikuman fights Black Emperor.

At first, Kinnikuman has trouble even catching Black Emperor, but as soon as he does Black Emperor begins using his Devil Fire technique. Meanwhile, the Idol Choujins all win their fights with their trademark techniques. Kinnikuman eventually defeats Black Emperor with his own version of the Devil Fire followed by his new finishing move, the Kinniku Driver.

Bibinba goes to embrace Kinnikuman, but he suggests that she go to Shishkeba Boo, who, although misguided, gave his best to fight for her honor. He then says that he already has Mari-san, at which point she suddenly pops up out of nowhere and the two are reunited.

Songs
Opening Theme
 by Akira Kushida

Closing Theme
 by Akira Kamiya (Kinnikuman)

Cast

 For unknown reasons, Masashi Hirose is uncredited for his appearance in this film.

External links

1984 anime films
Anime films based on manga
Films directed by Takeshi Shirato
Kinnikuman films